Shannon Ashlyn (born 20 February 1986) is a film and television actress, writer and director, known for her roles in the Australian horror film Wolf Creek 2, the Australian television series Love Child and the film Zelos. In 2018, she completed a Masters of Directing at the Australian Film Television and Radio School in Sydney, Australia. Sweet Tooth  is her graduating film.

Filmography

Film

Television

References

External links

Twitter

Australian film actresses
1986 births
Australian television actresses
Living people